Lục Ngạn is a rural district of Bắc Giang province in the Northeast region of Vietnam. This district is famous for its Kim Sơn Thiều lychee. As of 2019 the district had a population of 226,540. The district covers an area of 1,012 km². The district capital lies at Chũ.

Administrative divisions
The district is divided administratively into one township Chũ (the capital) and the communes of:

Cấm Sơn, Tân Sơn, Phong Vân, Sa Lý, Phong Minh, Sơn Hải, Hộ Đáp, Kim Sơn, Biên Sơn, Kiên Lao, Thanh Hải, Kiên Thành, Giáp Sơn, Biển Động, Tân Hoa, Tân Quang, Hồng Giang, Trù Hựu, Quý Sơn, Phượng Sơn, Mỹ An, Tân Mộc, Đèo Gia, Phỉ Điền, Đồng Cốc, Phú Nhuận, Nghĩa Hò, Tân Quang, Tân Lập and Nam Dương.

References

Districts of Bắc Giang province